Adrian Bakalli (born 22 November 1976) is a Belgian former professional footballer. He represented the Belgium Under-21 side.

He played for R.W.D. Molenbeek and Rode Verrewinkel before joining English side Watford in January 1999. During the 1999–00 he made two substitute appearances in the Premier League. He subsequently signed for Swindon Town, before returning to Belgium.

External links
Player profile at Blind, Stupid and Desperate
Career stats at Soccerbase 
Player profile at FootballPlus.com 
Player profile at WasWatford.co.uk

Player profile at PlayerHistory

1976 births
Living people
Belgian footballers
Belgian people of Albanian descent
R.W.D. Molenbeek players
Watford F.C. players
Swindon Town F.C. players
Premier League players
Expatriate footballers in England
Footballers from Brussels
K.F.C. Rhodienne-De Hoek players
Association football midfielders